WRSW-FM (107.3 FM) is a radio station broadcasting a classic hits format. Licensed to Warsaw, Indiana, United States, the station is owned by Kensington Digital Media of Indiana. The station was formerly owned by Talking Stick Communications, a subsidiary of Federated Media. The station features programming from Fox News Radio, and United Stations Radio Network.

The current on-air lineup includes Kris Lake (Lake City Morning Show), Hall of Famer Rita Price mid-days, Kenny Edwards afternoons and the syndicated Alice Cooper Show nights. The station also features news by Nick Deranek and sports by Roger Grossman.

The station signed on the air August 11, 1948 and celebrated 70 years of broadcasting in Warsaw, IN on August 11, 2018.

The station is programmed by Kris Lake, managed by Woody Zimmerman and is located in downtown Warsaw, IN.

The radio station (along with sister stations WAWC and WRSW) was purchased by Kensington Digital Media on May 15, 2018. The purchase, at a price of $2.4 million, was consummated on September 5, 2018.

References

External links

RSW-FM
Classic hits radio stations in the United States
Kosciusko County, Indiana
1948 establishments in Indiana
Radio stations established in 1948